Jorge Zataraín Pindeda (born 31 March 1988 in Mazatlán, Sinaloa) is a Mexican professional footballer who last played for Murciélagos of Ascenso MX on loan from Tapachula.

Career
Born in Mazatlán, Zataraín played in Ascenso MX with Necaxa, Veracruz, Altamira and Irapuato. He had a very brief spell in Liga MX with Club León.

References

External links
 

Liga MX players
Living people
1988 births
Mexican footballers
C.D. Veracruz footballers
Club Necaxa footballers
Irapuato F.C. footballers
Altamira F.C. players
Club León footballers
Sportspeople from Mazatlán
Association football midfielders
Footballers from Sinaloa
Ascenso MX players
Liga Premier de México players